Surprise Surprise is a 2009 drama written by Travis Michael Holder and Jerry Turner and directed by Jerry Turner.

Plot
Den, an in-the-closet TV star, and his younger disabled lover's lives are turned upside down when Den's troubled teenage son, David, whom Den never knew he had, comes into their lives.

David, a 16-year-old homophobe, shows up at the doorstep of Den's Hollywood Hills home and discovers both his famous dad and his younger lover Colin. Colin is a former dancer, now using a wheelchair. Though their relationship is secret, Den and Colin are committed to each other, something they hope will improve David's disposition, given his rocky adolescence.

Their otherwise seemingly idyllic and coveted life is permanently altered, as they are forced to confront an already problematic relationship. Eventually, all three men with the help of their unconventional and extended family are compelled to join together and redefine the concept of family.

Cast
Travis Michael Holder as Den Jorgensen
Luke Eberl (Lucas Elliot) as David Jorgensen
John Brotherton (of One Life to Live) as Colin Alexandre
Deborah Shelton (former Miss USA and actress on Dallas) as Junie Hannah
Jesse C. Boyd as Jason Aaron
Mary Jo Catlett (of Diff'rent Strokes) as Winnie Blythman

External links

2009 films
2009 drama films
American LGBT-related films
American drama films
LGBT-related drama films
2009 LGBT-related films
2000s English-language films
2000s American films